Crocus hadriaticus  is a species of flowering plant in the genus Crocus of the family Iridaceae. It is a cormous perennial with three subspecies native to Greece.

References

hadriaticus